Abū ʿAbdallāh Muḥammad ibn ʿAbdūs al-Jahshiyārī (d. 942) was a prominent Abbasid bureaucrat and scholar. He authored Kitab al-wuzara wa'l-kuttab (Book of Viziers and Scribes).

Life
Al-Jahshiyari was born in Kufa, a center of scholarship in the Islamic world. He was called "al-Jahshiyari" after one of his father's employers, Abu'l-Hasan Ali ibn Jahshiyari, the hajib (grand chamberlain) of the Abbasid caliph al-Muwaffaq.

A katib (scribe of secretary), al-Jahshiyari became a top bureaucrat of the Abbasid Caliphate in the 10th century. He succeeded his father Muhammad ibn Abdus as the hajib of Ali ibn Isa ibn al-Jarrah, the vizier of Caliph al-Muqtadir in 913–917. In 918 al-Jahshiyari led Ali ibn Isa's haras (personal guard) and afterward served as the hajib for Hamid ibn al-Abbas, who served as vizier in 918–923, though Ali ibn Isa continued to wield real power. Al-Jahshiyari's support for Ibn Muqla, a rival of Hamid's for the viziership, causing tensions with Hamid which may have been the reason he discontinued serving under him. Ibn Muqla became vizier in 928–930, 932, and 934–936, and al-Jahshiyari protected him when fell into disgrace. In 930 Ibn Muqla awarded al-Jahshiyari with the honor of transporting the kiswa, the black cloth used to cover the Kaaba in Mecca, during the Hajj (pilgrimage to Mecca) from Iraq that year. Five or six years later Ibn Muqla gifted him 200,000 dinars, according to the 13th-century historian Ibn al-Athir. His frequent involvement in court intrigues led to him being jailed and fined a number of times by unfriendly viziers and the amirs al-umara (commander of commanders) Ibn Ra'iq and Bajkam.

Al-Jahshiyari died in political obscurity in the Abbasid capital, Baghdad. It is not known if he had children.

Works
Al-Jahshiyari authored Kitab al-wuzara wa'l-kuttab (Book of Viziers and Scribes), a history of bureaucrats and administration. The book originally covered the period until 908 CE, but in its surviving form it ends with the reign of Caliph al-Mahdi. He also authored a no longer extant chronicle of the Caliph al-Muqtadir. The book honors the bureaucrats of the Caliphate, offering special praise for the Barmakids, a prominent family of viziers of the Abbasid caliphs, and is highly critical of their rivals, the Banu al-Furat. According to the historian Hugh N. Kennedy, al-Jahshiyari's view of the first century of Abbasid rule (750–850) is one of court intrigues, with "friendship, hatred and jealousy ... the main motive forces of his characters".

References

Bibliography

942 deaths
10th-century historians from the Abbasid Caliphate
10th-century Arabic writers
Officials of the Abbasid Caliphate
People from Kufa
Prisoners and detainees of the Abbasid Caliphate